Aleksa Marković may refer to:

Aleksa Marković (Austrian footballer) (born 2001)
Aleksa Marković (Canadian soccer) (born 1997)